In Greek mythology, Evagoras or Euagoras (Ancient Greek: Εὐαγόρας) may refer to the following personages:

 Evagoras, a prince of Pylos and son of King Neleus by Chloris, daughter of Amphion. He was the brother to Pero, Taurus, Asterius, Pylaon, Deimachus, Eurybius, Epilaus, Phrasius, Eurymenes, Alastor, Nestor and Periclymenus. Along with his father and other brothers, except Nestor, he was killed by Heracles during the sack of Pylos.
 Evagoras, a Trojan prince was one of the children of King Priam of Troy by another woman.

Notes

References 

 Gaius Julius Hyginus, Fabulae from The Myths of Hyginus translated and edited by Mary Grant. University of Kansas Publications in Humanistic Studies. Online version at the Topos Text Project.
Homer, The Odyssey with an English Translation by A.T. Murray, PH.D. in two volumes. Cambridge, MA., Harvard University Press; London, William Heinemann, Ltd. 1919. Online version at the Perseus Digital Library. Greek text available from the same website.
 Pseudo-Apollodorus, The Library with an English Translation by Sir James George Frazer, F.B.A., F.R.S. in 2 Volumes, Cambridge, MA, Harvard University Press; London, William Heinemann Ltd. 1921. Online version at the Perseus Digital Library. Greek text available from the same website.

Neleides
Princes in Greek mythology
Trojans
Children of Priam
Pylian characters in Greek mythology